Ošelín is a municipality and village in Tachov District in the Plzeň Region of the Czech Republic. It has about 200 inhabitants.

Administrative parts
Hamlets of Dolní Plezom, Horní Plezom, Lobzy and Plezom are administrative parts of Ošelín.

References

Villages in Tachov District